Colin McDonald may refer to:
Colin McDonald (Australian cricketer) (1928–2021), Australian cricketer
Colin McDonald (New Zealand cricketer) (1948-2005), New Zealand cricketer
Colin McDonald (footballer, born 1930), English football goalkeeper
Colin McDonald (footballer, born 1974), Scottish football forward
Colin McDonald (ice hockey) (born 1984), American ice hockey player
Colin MacGilp MacDonald, British historian and author

See also
Colin MacDonald (disambiguation)